Victor Arthur Siegel (August 24, 1920 – July 7, 2017) was an American professional basketball player. He played for the Tri-Cities Blackhawks in the National Basketball League during the 1946–47 season and averaged 1.4 points per game.

A native of Davenport, Iowa, Siegel played college basketball at the University of Iowa and earned varsity letters for three seasons, earning a second-team all-Big Ten Conference honor as a senior in 1941–42. He also played on the school's golf team. After college (and before his brief professional basketball career), Siegel served in the United States Coast Guard during World War II. He later worked as a factory supervisor in East Moline, Illinois for 31 years before retiring in 1978.

References

1920 births
2017 deaths
American men's basketball players
United States Coast Guard personnel of World War II
Basketball players from Iowa
Iowa Hawkeyes men's golfers
Guards (basketball)
Iowa Hawkeyes men's basketball players
Sportspeople from Davenport, Iowa
Tri-Cities Blackhawks players